Cheryl Jones (born May 3, 1964) is an American former professional tennis player.

Biography
Jones played college tennis for the USC Trojans in 1983 and 1984, then joined the professional tour. As a doubles player she reached a best world ranking of 91 and won one WTA Tour title, the 1987 Brasil Open, partnering Katrina Adams. In 1988 she featured in the main draw of the women's doubles at the French Open, Wimbledon and US Open.

From 1989 to 1995, Jones was the women's tennis head coach of the USC Trojans. She is the first African-American woman to have coached an NCAA Division I tennis team.

WTA Tour finals

Doubles (1–0)

References

External links
 
 

1964 births
Living people
American female tennis players
African-American female tennis players
USC Trojans women's tennis players
USC Trojans women's tennis coaches
21st-century African-American people
21st-century African-American women
20th-century African-American sportspeople
20th-century African-American women
20th-century African-American people
American tennis coaches